Nicolae Rainea (19 November 1933 – 1 April 2015), nicknamed The Locomotive of the Carpathians, was a Romanian football referee and player. Highly regarded throughout the world, he is considered one of the best whistles of his generation and, arguably, the finest Romanian referee of all time.

Career
Nicolae Rainea played football in the lower leagues of Romania for Laminorul Brăila, Metalul Piatra Neamț and Constructorul Bârlad, he retired in 1959 to start his career as a referee, making his debut in Liga I in 1965.
He refereed at three FIFA World Cups (1974, 1978, 1982), the UEFA Euro 1980 Final, the 1983 European Cup Final, the second leg of the 1978 European Super Cup and the second leg of the 1978 UEFA Cup Final.

Rainea officiated the Italy v Argentina game at the 1982 World Cup. He was linesman in a later match between France and Northern Ireland.

Honours and legacy
Rainea was decorated by two presidents of Romania, Ion Iliescu and Traian Băsescu. He was made honorary citizen of Galați where he resided and served four local council terms.

Nicolae Rainea Stadium in Galați is named after him.

Personal life and death
In 2011, he celebrated 50 years of marriage. He had a son and a daughter, both living in Sweden.

After an untreated mild cold turned into a pulmonary edema, Rainea suffered a cardiac arrest while in hospital and died on 1 April 2015 in Galați. He was 81 years old.

References

External links
  Profile

Sportspeople from Brăila
1933 births
AFC Dacia Unirea Brăila players
Romanian football referees
FIFA World Cup referees
2015 deaths
1982 FIFA World Cup referees
1978 FIFA World Cup referees
1974 FIFA World Cup referees
Romanian sportsperson-politicians
Social Democratic Party (Romania) politicians
Councillors in Romania
UEFA Euro 1980 referees
UEFA European Championship final referees
Association footballers not categorized by position
Romanian footballers
Deaths from pulmonary edema